Guilty as Charged is a 1991 American comedy film directed by Sam Irvin and starring Rod Steiger and Lauren Hutton.

Cast
Rod Steiger as Kallin
Lauren Hutton as Liz
Heather Graham as Kimberly
Lyman Ward as Stanford
Isaac Hayes as Aloysius
Zelda Rubinstein as Edna
Michael Beach as Hamilton
Irwin Keyes as Deek
Earl Boen as Chemical Manufacturer
Ricky Dean Logan as Ricky Landon
Gale Mayron as Fran
Michael Talbott as Sparrow

Reception

Leonard Maltin gave it two and a half stars.

References

External links
 
 

American comedy films
Films directed by Sam Irvin
Films scored by Steve Bartek
1990s English-language films
1990s American films